Maestro  is a Georgian television channel launched in February 1995, located in Tbilisi.

Satellite dishes' affair
On July 2, Maestro TV announced that one of its co-owners and its financial backer, Maka Asatiani, was planning significant investments for further development of the television channel. The TV channel is available through some cable providers mainly in Tbilisi and via satellite. As part of the efforts to broaden the scope of audience, Maestro TV said earlier that month, it was planning to launch a campaign ‘Maestro in Every Family’, involving “handing out” satellite dish antennas to households in the provinces. The satellite dishes were seized as part of an investigation into a vote-buying scheme allegedly orchestrated by Bidzina Ivanishvili and for which the billionaire opposition politician was fine with GEL 63.1 million. Though, Bacho Kikabidze, general director of Maestro TV, denied having links with Ivanishvili-affiliated companies or with the politics and said the allegation by the chief prosecutor's office was “absurd”. One of Maestro TV's co-owners, Mamuka Glonti, also said that satellite dishes were to sold rather than hand out freely, so they could not have been involved in the vote-buying process.

See also 
 Media of Georgia

External links 
 www.maestro.ge
 maestro live

References 

Television stations in Georgia (country)
Television channels and stations established in 1995
Mass media in Tbilisi
Georgian-language television stations